is an urban expressway in Nagoya, Japan. It is a part of the Nagoya Expressway network and is owned and operated by Nagoya Expressway Public Corporation.

Overview

The first section was opened to traffic in 1979 (also the first segment of the entire Nagoya Expressway Network) and the entire route was completed in 1985. The expressway is 4 lanes for its entire length.

The route originates from its junction with the Ring Route and extends southward. At its southern terminus it connects to the Isewangan Expressway and Chitahantō Road. Together with the Chitahantō Road, it forms the main road link connecting Chubu International Airport with central Nagoya.

Interchange list

 JCT - junction, TB - toll gate

References

External links
 Nagoya Expressway Public Corporation

Nagoya Expressway